Poland competed at the 1974 European Athletics Championships in Rome, Italy, from 1-8 September 1974. A delegation of 56 athletes were sent to represent the country.

Medals

References

European Athletics Championships
1974
Nations at the 1974 European Athletics Championships